According to one of several competing origin myths of the Merina people of Imerina in the central Highlands of Madagascar, Andrianerinerina is the incarnation of the son of God (Zanahary) from which the line of Merina rulers is said to have descended.

According to the legend, the son of Zanahary descended to Earth at a location named Anerinerina (north of Angavokely) – source of the sovereign's Earthly name – to play with the Vazimba, the reportedly primitive original inhabitants of Madagascar.  The Vazimba were specifically warned not to cook Andrianerinerina's sheep because he couldn't consume their flesh, but one was nonetheless butchered and cooked in a stew that was served to him.  By unwittingly eating the forbidden mutton, Andrianerinerina was no longer able to return to the heavens to rejoin his father.  As a consequence, Zanahary gave the Vazimba a choice: to "untie the threads of their lives" or to accept Andrianerinerina as their lord and master.  They chose to accept to serve Andrianerinerina rather than be destroyed by Zanahary, who then sent down one of his daughters, Andriamanitra, as a wife to Andrianerinerina, and the royal line was begun.

References

Malagasy monarchs
Malagasy mythology
History of Madagascar